Frans Mosman (5 December 1904 – 1 June 1994) was a Dutch foil and sabre fencer. He competed at the 1928, 1936 and 1948 Summer Olympics.

References

External links
 

1904 births
1994 deaths
Dutch male foil fencers
Olympic fencers of the Netherlands
Fencers at the 1928 Summer Olympics
Fencers at the 1936 Summer Olympics
Fencers at the 1948 Summer Olympics
Fencers from Amsterdam
Dutch male sabre fencers
20th-century Dutch people